Expected shortfall (ES) is a risk measure—a concept used in the field of financial risk measurement to evaluate the market risk or credit risk of a portfolio. The "expected shortfall at q% level" is the expected return on the portfolio in the worst  of cases. ES is an alternative to value at risk that is more sensitive to the shape of the tail of the loss distribution.

Expected shortfall is also called conditional value at risk (CVaR), average value at risk (AVaR), expected tail loss (ETL), and superquantile.

ES estimates the risk of an investment in a conservative way, focusing on the less profitable outcomes. For high values of  it ignores the most profitable but unlikely possibilities, while for small values of  it focuses on the worst losses. On the other hand, unlike the discounted maximum loss, even for lower values of  the expected shortfall does not consider only the single most catastrophic outcome. A value of  often used in practice is 5%.

Expected shortfall is considered a more useful risk measure than VaR because it is a coherent spectral measure of financial portfolio risk. It is calculated for a given quantile-level , and is defined to be the mean loss of portfolio value given that a loss is occurring at or below the -quantile.

Formal definition
If  (an Lp space) is the payoff of a portfolio at some future time and  then we define the expected shortfall as

where  is the value at risk. This can be equivalently written as

The dual representation is

where  is the set of probability measures which are absolutely continuous to the physical measure  such that  almost surely.

Expected shortfall can be generalized to a general class of coherent risk measures on  spaces (Lp space) with a corresponding dual characterization in the corresponding  dual space. The domain can be extended for more general Orlicz Hearts.

Informally, and non rigorously, this equation amounts to saying "in case of losses so severe that they occur only alpha percent of the time, what is our average loss".

Expected shortfall can also be written as a distortion risk measure given by the distortion function

Examples 

Example 1. If we believe our average loss on the worst 5% of the possible outcomes for our portfolio is EUR 1000, then we could say our expected shortfall is EUR 1000 for the 5% tail.

Example 2. Consider a portfolio that will have the following possible values at the end of the period:

Now assume that we paid 100 at the beginning of the period for this portfolio. Then the profit in each case is (ending value−100) or:

From this table let us calculate the expected shortfall  for a few values of :

These cases belong to (are a subset of) row 1 in the profit table, which have a profit of −100 (total loss of the 100 invested). The expected profit for these cases is −100.

These cases are as follows: 10 cases from row one, and 10 cases from row two (note that 10+10 equals the desired 20 cases). For row 1 there is a profit of −100, while for row 2 a profit of −20. Using the expected value formula we get

In general the last row selected may not be fully used (for example in calculating  we used only 10 of the 30 cases per 100 provided by row 2).

As a final example, calculate . This is the expectation over all cases, or

The value at risk (VaR) is given below for comparison.

Properties 
The expected shortfall  increases as  decreases.

The 100%-quantile expected shortfall  equals negative of the expected value of the portfolio.

For a given portfolio, the expected shortfall  is greater than or equal to the Value at Risk  at the same  level.

Optimization of expected shortfall 
Expected shortfall, in its standard form, is known to lead to a generally non-convex optimization problem. However, it is possible to transform the problem into a linear program and find the global solution. This property makes expected shortfall a cornerstone of alternatives to mean-variance portfolio optimization, which account for the higher moments (e.g., skewness and kurtosis) of a return distribution.

Suppose that we want to minimize the expected shortfall of a portfolio. To numerically compute the expected shortfall for a set of portfolio returns, it is necessary to generate  simulations of the portfolio constituents; this is often done using copulas. With these simulations in hand, the auxiliary function may be approximated by:This is equivalent to the formulation: Finally, choosing a linear loss function  turns the optimization problem into a linear program. Using standard methods, it is then easy to find the portfolio that minimizes expected shortfall.

Formulas for continuous probability distributions 
Closed-form formulas exist for calculating the expected shortfall when the payoff of a portfolio  or a corresponding loss  follows a specific continuous distribution. In the former case the expected shortfall corresponds to the opposite number of the left-tail conditional expectation below :

 

 

Since some formulas below were derived for the left-tail case and some for the right-tail case, the following reconciliations can be useful:

Normal distribution 

Generalized Student's t-distribution 

Laplace distribution 
If the payoff of a portfolio  follows the Laplace distribution with the p.d.f.

 

and the c.d.f.

 

If the loss of a portfolio  follows the Laplace distribution, the expected shortfall is equal to

Logistic distribution 

Exponential distribution 

Pareto distribution 

Generalized Pareto distribution (GPD) 
If the loss of a portfolio  follows the GPD with p.d.f.

 

and the c.d.f.

 

then the expected shortfall is equal to

 

and the VaR is equal to

Weibull distribution 

Generalized extreme value distribution (GEV) 

Generalized hyperbolic secant (GHS) distribution 

Johnson's SU-distribution 

Burr type XII distribution 
If the payoff of a portfolio  follows the Burr type XII distribution  the p.d.f.  and the c.d.f. Alternatively, .

Dagum distribution 
If the payoff of a portfolio  follows the Dagum distribution with  p.d.f.  and the c.d.f.

Lognormal distribution 
If the payoff of a portfolio  follows lognormal distribution, i.e. the random variable  follows the normal distribution with p.d.f.

Log-logistic distribution 
If the payoff of a portfolio  follows log-logistic distribution, i.e. the random variable  follows the logistic distribution with p.d.f.

As the incomplete beta function is defined only for positive arguments, for a more generic case the expected shortfall can be expressed with the hypergeometric function: .

If the loss of a portfolio  follows log-logistic distribution with p.d.f.  and c.d.f.

Log-Laplace distribution 
If the payoff of a portfolio  follows log-Laplace distribution, i.e. the random variable  follows the Laplace distribution the p.d.f.

Log-generalized hyperbolic secant (log-GHS) distribution 
If the payoff of a portfolio  follows log-GHS distribution, i.e. the random variable  follows the GHS distribution with p.d.f.

Dynamic expected shortfall 
The conditional version of the expected shortfall at the time t is defined by

where .

This is not a time-consistent risk measure. The time-consistent version is given by

such that

See also 
 Coherent risk measure
 EMP for stochastic programming – solution technology for optimization problems involving ES and VaR
 Entropic value at risk
 Value at risk

Methods of statistical estimation of VaR and ES can be found in Embrechts et al. and Novak. When forecasting VaR and ES, or optimizing portfolios to minimize tail risk, it is important to account for asymmetric dependence and non-normalities in the distribution of stock returns such as auto-regression, asymmetric volatility, skewness, and kurtosis.

References

External links
 Rockafellar, Uryasev: Optimization of conditional Value-at-Risk, 2000.
 C. Acerbi and D. Tasche: On the Coherence of Expected Shortfall, 2002.
 Rockafellar, Uryasev: Conditional Value-at-Risk for general loss distributions, 2002.
 Acerbi: Spectral measures of risk, 2005
 Phi-Alpha optimal portfolios and extreme risk management, Best of Wilmott, 2003
 "Coherent measures of Risk", Philippe Artzner, Freddy Delbaen, Jean-Marc Eber, and David Heath

Financial risk modeling
Actuarial science
Monte Carlo methods in finance
Linear programming
Financial models
Market risk